The 15th FINA World Swimming Championships (25 m) were held from 16 to 21 December 2021 in Abu Dhabi, United Arab Emirates. It was previously scheduled for 13 to 18 December but moved back three days on 24 February 2021. Originally scheduled to be held in 2020, the championships were pushed back one year as a result of the COVID-19 pandemic. Competition took place in a 25-metre (short course) temporary pool installed at Etihad Arena.

In September 2021, it was announced the Championships would be part of a larger aquatics program, called the Abu Dhabi Aquatics Festival, which includes competition in open water swimming, diving, and high diving.

Qualification
The qualification period for competing at the 2021 World Swimming Championships ran from 1 December 2019 through 28 November 2021. On 23 November 2021, FINA announced it would take into consideration times swum as part of the 2021 International Swimming League and allow them to count towards qualification for the 2021 World Championships. In addition to country-specific selection procedures, competitors were required to achieve a qualifying "A" or "B" time in an event to qualify for the individual or a relay event with individual entries capped at two competitors per country and relay entries capped at one team per country.

Below are the qualifying times for the 2021 World Championships as determined by FINA:

Schedule
An opening ceremony preceded the start of pool swimming competition on 16 December, was followed by competition from 16 December to 21 December, and concluded with a closing ceremony on 21 December. A total of 46 events were held.

Medal summary

Medal table

Results

Men's events

 Swimmers who participated in the heats only and received medals.

Women's events

 Swimmers who participated in the heats only and received medals.

Mixed events

 Swimmers who participated in the heats only and received medals.

Coverage
More than 180 countries provided viewing opportunities through television broadcast and online streaming mediums. One of the broadcasting agencies providing coverage of pool swimming competition internationally is the Olympic Channel. Additional international coverage was provided by Eurovision Sports.

Variations in country representation
Due to a multi-year ban of Russian representation at World Championships by the Court of Arbitration for Sport, competitors from the country were not allowed to compete using their flag, anthem, nor country name during competition, instead competing with the name Russian Swimming Federation.

Issues related to COVID-19
On 14 December 2021, it was announced that South African swimmers residing in South Africa would not be able to compete in the championships, due to travel bans resulting from the prevalence of the Omicron variant of COVID-19, which is the World Health Organization's latest “variant of concern.”

On 16 December 2021, FINA informed the Singapore Swimming Association that its entire squad will not be able to compete in the championships due to contact tracing protocols, after four of the country's swimmers tested positive for COVID-19 while in Abu Dhabi.

On 17 December 2021, FINA confirmed seven accredited participants with positive COVID-19 results, which included at least one administrator from Nigeria, and that in turn knocked out all four of Nigeria's swimmers from the meet. This raised questions about its protocols, as some swimmers from other nations such as Great Britain and the United States were allowed to continue competing despite members of those teams testing positive for COVID-19.

By the end of the championships on 21 December 2021, FINA provided a cap number of 40 individuals who tested positive in the duration of the meet. Later the exact number of COVID-19 positive accounts was provided, 37 cases total out of all 5,000 individuals involved with the competition, 15 of which were athlete cases.

References

External links
Official website
Results book

 
FINA World Swimming Championships (25 m)
World Championships
2021 in Emirati sport
International sports competitions hosted by the United Arab Emirates
Sport in Abu Dhabi
Swimming competitions in the United Arab Emirates
FINA
FINA Swimming Championships, 2021 25m